At least 29 people died and another 50 were injured in a suicide bombing attack on a police station near the Port of Mogadishu. Most of the people killed and wounded in the bombing were reported to be civilians and seaport employees.

References

Somali Civil War (2009–present)
2016 murders in Somalia
December 2016 crimes in Africa
Mass murder in 2016
Mass murder in Somalia
Suicide bombings in Somalia
Terrorist incidents in Somalia in 2016
21st century in Mogadishu
Attacks on police stations in the 2010s
Terrorist incidents in Mogadishu